Wookey Hole is a village in Somerset, England. It is the location of the Wookey Hole show caves.

Location
Wookey Hole is located in the civil parish of St Cuthbert Out, in Mendip District. It is one mile north-west of the city of Wells, and lies on the border of the Mendip Hills Area of Outstanding Natural Beauty (AONB).

Toponymy
One possible origin for the name Wookey is from the Old English wocig (an animal trap), although it is also a possible alteration from a Celtic word ogo (cave), referring to Wookey Hole Caves.

Features

The village of Wookey Hole is dominated by the Wookey Hole Caves tourist site which has show caves and a controversial crazy golf course which was built on the site of the village bowling green.

The village has shops, a pub, restaurants, hotels and a campsite. The Grade II listed Church of St Mary Magdalene dates to 1873-74.

The former paper mill building, whose water wheel is powered by a small canal from the river, dates from around 1860 and is a Grade II-listed building. The production of handmade paper ceased in February 2008 after the owner Gerry Cottle concluded there was no longer a market for the product, and therefore sold most of the historic machinery.

Glencot House is a Grade II listed country house dating from 1887, by Ernest George and Harold Peto, for W. S. Hodgkinson. A report of the building appeared in The Building News, 13 May 1887; the architect's drawing was exhibited at the Royal Academy, and is now at RIBA.

The 18th-century Bubwith farmhouse is also a Grade II listed building, as is the post office in the High Street.

The Monarch's Way and Mendip Way long-distance footpaths both pass through the village, as does National Cycle Route 3. Ebbor Gorge National Nature Reserve is just outside the village.

References

External links

Mendip Hills
Villages in Mendip District